Décines-Charpieu is a commune in the Metropolis of Lyon in Auvergne-Rhône-Alpes region in eastern France. The name of the city is often shortened and simply called Décines.

Geography
Décines is located near Grand Large reservoir, and Lyon is located 12 kilometres west.

History 

Décines left the department of Isère to join the department of Rhône in 1968, and became a member of the Communauté urbaine de Lyon in 1969. On 1 January 2015, Décines left the department of Rhône to join the Metropolis of Lyon.

Population

Education

 there were nine public preschools (maternelles), nine public elementary schools (some preschools and elementary schools are grouped into combined primary schools), two public junior high schools (Collège Georges Brassens and Collège Maryse Bastie), and one public senior high school/sixth-form college (Lycée d'Enseignement Polyvalent Chaplin-Becquerel).

There is one Catholic private day school, École maternelle/primaire/Collège Jeanne d'Arc.

There is an Islamic day school, .

Sport

The stadium of Olympique Lyonnais, Parc Olympique Lyonnais, is located in Décines-Charpieu. It is the home venue of Ligue 1 club Lyon as well as hosting several UEFA Women's Champions League matches for the club's women's team. The stadium held several matches of UEFA Euro 2016 including a semi-final. It has hosted the 2017 Coupe de la Ligue Final, the 2018 UEFA Europa League Final, and the 2019 FIFA Women's World Cup Final and semi-finals.

The stadium has also hosted several rugby union matches, including the Rugby Champions Cup and Rugby Challenge Cup finals of 2016.

Parc Olympique Lyonnais is planned to host matches for the 2023 Rugby World Cup and the men and women's football tournaments at the 2024 Summer Olympics.

Notable sites

Surrounding cities
 Chassieu
 Bron
 Vaulx-en-Velin
 Meyzieu

People
 Cédric Bardon - footballer
 Jean Djorkaeff - footballer
 Youri Djorkaeff - footballer
 Abdelkader Ghezzal - footballer
 Rachid Ghezzal - footballer
 Jonathan Leria - basketball player
 Malela Mutuale - basketball player
 Kamel Ramdani - footballer
 Thierry Hupond - bicycle racer
 Claire Pommet - Singer/Songwriter

References

External links

 Official website (in French)

Communes of Lyon Metropolis
Armenian diaspora communities
Dauphiné